Swerea is a Swedish research group specialising in applied scientific research in materials development, production and product development.  The group operates mainly in Sweden for industry with operations in Sweden, but also owns the Corrosion Institute in France. The Swerea group consists of five research institutes: Swerea IVF, Swerea KIMAB, Swerea MEFOS, Swerea SWECAST and Swerea SICOMP. Office locations were Kista (Stockholm), Luleå, Piteå, Mölndal (Göteborg), Jönköping, Linköping, Eskilstuna, Trollhättan, Oslo, St Etienne och Brest.

October 1, 2018 Research Institutes of Sweden (RISE) acquired two-thirds of the research group, including Swerea IVF, Swerea SICOMP, Swerea SWECAST and the corrosion area of Swerea KIMAB. These companies now make up the RISE division Materials and Production and has subsequently changed name to RISE IVF, RISE SICOMP, RISE SWECAST and RISE KIMAB.

MEFOS and the remaining part of Swerea KIMAB launched a new research institute, Swerim, with a focus on mining, mineral, steel and metal research, partly owned by RISE.

Ownership
RISE Research Institutes of Sweden is now the sole owner of Swerea AB who in turn owns the companies Swerea IVF, Swerea SICOMP, Swerea SWECAST and Swerea KIMAB (the corrosion area). RISE operates under the Ministry of Enterprise and Innovation (Sweden).

History
During the beginning and mid 20th century Swedish industry prospered. A a result of the blooming years a number of research institutes were formed to ensure further development. The first was the Metallographic Institute (Metallografiska institutet), founded in 1921 by director and physicist Carl Benedicks.  The institute was to go through many name changes and mergers. From The Metallographic institute to The Institute for metal research (IM) to Swerea KIMAB, when it merged with the Corrosion Institute in 2005/2006 and became a part of the Swerea group. The Institute for Engineering Technology (Institutet för verkstadsteknisk forskning, IVF) and The Swedish Foundry Association (Svenska Gjuteriföreningen) were also formed during those good years. The Swedish Foundry Association eventually split into one research institute, Swerea SWECAST, and one trade association that kept the original name. When industry development and economy experienced a dip in the late 20th century, SICOMP was founded, in 1988, in order to strengthen competition through contributing with more advanced knowledge and research on composite material. SICOMP became Swerea SICOMP, a part of  the Swerea group, when Swerea was founded in 2005. October 1, 2018 two thirds of the Swerea group became RISE Research Institutes of Sweden. The remaining part formed a new institute, Swerim.

Research collaborations 
Swerea research focus on materials development, production development and product development. The research group takes part in international research efforts such as CleanSky, STEPWISE, Fire-resist, Biobased Industries etcetera.

Subsidiaries

References

Research institutes in Sweden